Platysphinx zabolichus is a moth of the  family Sphingidae. It is known from South Africa.

The length of the forewings is 46 cm for males. The top of the body and front wings are pale yellow, while the forewing has a discreet greyish beige pattern. The top of the hindwing is speckled yellow with red spots. It is only convincingly separable from Platysphinx piabilis by examining the genitalia.

References

Platysphinx
Moths described in 2007